Herbert Walton may refer to:

 Herbert Walton (cricketer) (1868–1930), English cricketer
 Herbert Walton (priest) (died 1955), Anglican priest
 Herbert James Walton (1869–1938), English surgeon and naturalist